Allie B. Latimer (born February 16, 1928, in Coraopolis, Pennsylvania) was the first woman and the first African American to serve as General Counsel of a major United States federal agency. In her work to bring the government into compliance with the Civil Rights Act, she founded and developed Federally Employed Women (FEW) and worked to end gender discrimination in public sector jobs throughout her 40+ year career. According to the National Women's Hall of Fame, “FEW’s many accomplishments and activities have impacted the federal workplace and contributed to improved working conditions for all.”

Early years

Allie B. Latimer was born in Pennsylvania and raised in Alabama. She was the daughter of a school teacher and a construction builder. After her graduation from high school, Latimer got her Bachelor of Arts degree from Hampton Institute (Hampton University). Soon after that, she volunteered for two years with the American Friends Service Committee, doing work in prisons and mental institutions. She participated in an attempt to desegregate the New Jersey State Hospital at Vineland and integrate a suburban community outside Philadelphia, Pennsylvania.

Latimer later enrolled in Howard University School of Law and earned her Juris Doctor in 1953. In 1958, she earned a Master of Legal Letters degree from The Catholic University of America Columbus School of Law, and earned both a Master of Divinity degree and a Doctor of Ministry degree from Howard University School of Divinity.

Religious work
In 1969, Latimer became an Ordained Elder at Northeastern Presbyterian Church in Washington, DC. She traveled to more than fifty countries to participate in various church-related conferences.

Civil rights activism
An attorney, civil rights activist and humanitarian, Allie B. Latimer organized the organization Federally Employed Women (FEW) in 1968 and served as its founding president until 1969. The organization began as a grassroots effort in support of equality of opportunity for all. To date, FEW has more than two hundred chapters nationwide. FEW’s accomplishments have impacted the federal workplace and contributed to improved working conditions for all federal employees as well as providing a model for other workplaces.

An article published in The Chicago Defender in 1973 stated that Latimer “demonstrated professional competence” as well as having “distinguished service to the agency”. An article in The Washington Post'' wrote that "GSA is now becoming the lead agency in the upward mobility program for women".

In 1977, Dr. Allie Latimer became General Counsel of the General Services Administration (GSA) and became both the first woman and the first African American to serve as General Counsel of any major United States federal agency.

Awards
She received the Foremother Award from the National Center for Health Research in 2005. In 2009 Allie B. Latimer was inducted into the National Women's Hall of Fame.

References

1928 births
Living people
Christians from Pennsylvania
Hampton University alumni
Howard University School of Law alumni
Columbus School of Law alumni
Lawyers who have represented the United States government
African-American women lawyers
American women lawyers
African-American lawyers
Alabama lawyers
Pennsylvania lawyers
Christians from Alabama
21st-century African-American people
21st-century African-American women
20th-century African-American people
20th-century African-American women